Tejo may refer to:

Tagus (Portuguese: Tejo), a river on the Iberian Peninsula.
Tejo (sport), a sport and national pastime of Colombia.
Tejo (Argentina), a sport and national pastime of Argentina.
Tutmonda Esperantista Junulara Organizo (World Esperanto Youth Organization).
Tejo, Ethiopia, the administrative center of Yemalogi Welele.